Viveros / Derechos Humanos (formerly Viveros) is a metro station along Line 3 of the Mexico City Metro. It is located between the Álvaro Obregón and Coyoacán boroughs of Mexico City.

General information
The station logo depicts the silhouette of a plant, and the metro station is named after the nearby Viveros de Coyoacán arboretum and nursery (parts of which are a publicly accessible park and a popular area for recreation), founded by engineer Miguel Ángel de Quevedo in the former ranch of Panzacola.  The station opened on 30 August 1983.

Viveros / Derechos Humanos serves the Colonia Barrio de Santa Catarina, Florida, and Axotla neighborhoods, and is mainly used to link with the bus lines on Avenida Universidad.

Inside the station is a mural by artist Jason Schell entitled A Sunday Afternoon Under Mexico City (Una Tarde Dominical Bajo la Ciudad de Mexico).

Ridership

Nearby
Viveros de Coyoacán, public 38.9 hectares park.

Exits
East: Avenida Universidad, Barrio de Santa Catarina
West: Avenida Universidad and Hortensia street, Barrio de Santa Catarina

References

External links 

Viveros
Mexico City Metro stations in Álvaro Obregón, Mexico City
Railway stations opened in 1983
1983 establishments in Mexico
Mexico City Metro stations in Coyoacán
Accessible Mexico City Metro stations